Kheyrabad (also Romanized as Kheyrābād; also known as Khairābād) is a village in Karizan Rural District, Nasrabad District, Torbat-e Jam County, Razavi Khorasan Province, Iran. At the 2006 census, its population was 4,242, in 983 families.

References 

Populated places in Torbat-e Jam County